Semaphorin-6A is a protein that in humans is encoded by the SEMA6A gene.

In melanocytic cells SEMA6A gene expression may be regulated by MITF.

References

Further reading